Apostolos Christou (born 1 November 1996) is a Greek swimmer. He competed for Greece at the 2016 Summer Olympics in Rio de Janeiro. In the men's 100 metre backstroke competition, he placed 18th in the heats with a time of 54.12 seconds and did not qualify for the semifinals. In the men's 200 metre backstroke competition, he placed 24th in the heats with a time of 1:59.78 and did not qualify for the semifinals. Christou also swam on the men's 4 x 100 metre medley relay team for Greece. They placed 15th in the heats and did not qualify for the final.

References

External links
Apostolos Christou – The-Sports.org

1996 births
Living people
Greek male swimmers
Male backstroke swimmers
Swimmers from Athens
Swimmers at the 2014 Summer Youth Olympics
European Aquatics Championships medalists in swimming
Swimmers at the 2016 Summer Olympics
Swimmers at the 2020 Summer Olympics
Olympic swimmers of Greece
Mediterranean Games gold medalists for Greece
Mediterranean Games silver medalists for Greece
Mediterranean Games bronze medalists for Greece
Mediterranean Games medalists in swimming
Swimmers at the 2018 Mediterranean Games